The 1992 Troy State vs. DeVry men's basketball game is the highest-scoring men's basketball game in National Collegiate Athletic Association (NCAA) history, regardless of division classification. On January 12, 1992, Troy State University, now known as Troy University, defeated DeVry University of Atlanta 258–141 in a game that is considered to have established several unbreakable records.

Background
During the 1991–92 college basketball season, Troy State was playing its next to last year as an NCAA Division II school before transitioning to Division I. They were led by head coach Don Maestri, whose unconventional offense-oriented system led to incredibly high-scoring games; that season, Troy State led all of Division II with a 121.0 points per game scoring average (while also giving up 107.8 per game). They attempted an NCAA-record 1,303 three-pointers in 1991–92 and scored on 444 of them. Maestri's philosophy was to unapologetically attempt steals on an opponent's every possession, and if they missed the steal, they allowed the opponent to score as long as they scored quickly. He substituted players regularly and knew that his track-meet style of pressure would eventually wear out the other team. Once tired, his Troy State squads would continue to relentlessly pursue opponents on the defensive end; on offense, no shot was considered a bad shot, and the quicker the attempt, the better. The high-octane offense used by Troy State was modeled after Paul Westhead's Loyola Marymount teams of the era; Maestri even had Westhead mail him Loyola Marymount game tapes to study the plays and methods used by the successful Division I school.

Heading into the match-up against DeVry University of Atlanta, the Trojans sported a 12–3 record while the DeVry Hoyas had a 3–15 record. DeVry was classified as a National Association of Intercollegiate Athletics (NAIA) Division II school; it struggled to get wins against comparably talented opponents, let alone high-octane, successful NCAA Division II schools. The previous season, Troy State had set the NCAA record for points in a game with 187—also against DeVry of Atlanta. Stacking the odds further against DeVry was that they had only seven players, thus any chance of resting and catching their breath during substitutions was minimal at best.

The game
After tip-off, Troy State scored their first basket after 54 seconds. Player Paul Bryan later said, jokingly, "It was a little touch and go there early." Despite their frenetic pace, the Trojans "only" had 15 points after the first three minutes. As the game settled into its soon-to-be record breaking pace, points came steadily; with 3:14 remaining in the first half, Troy eclipsed the 100-point mark. Guard Tommy Davis said, "When you see one guy hitting, then everybody gets in the act. It becomes contagious." At the end of the first half, the score was 123–53. They made 21 three-pointers in the first 20 minutes, and their 123 points had already broken their own NCAA single-half record from the year before (103), also set against DeVry.

Within the first three minutes of the second half, the Trojans scored 26 points and had already accumulated 149 overall with 17 minutes remaining. It was not until 6:35 into the second half that Troy State scored their first points of the half that were not three-pointers or dunks. With 10 minutes remaining, Chris Greasham's three-pointer gave Troy 189, eclipsing the previous NCAA single-game scoring record of 187. Then, with 7:53 to go, they surpassed the 200-point mark, becoming the first and only team in college basketball history to surpass this threshold. The scoreboard was not built to display 200-plus points, and so when the moment occurred, it did not display the numbers correctly (the scoreboard operator's solution was to start over at zero). During the second half alone, the Trojans scored 135 points, besting their minutes-old record of 123, and their 30 three-pointers in the second stanza was higher than the NCAA all-time full-game record of 25 (set previously by Troy). Their 51 made three-point field goals more than doubled that record, and their 109 three-point attempts record stood for 31 seasons before being broken in December 2022. Tommy Davis remarked that the game "reminded [him] of a street game you play in the summer." Jack Smith credited their home crowd to giving players the extra energy they needed to maintain the record-shattering pace: "It seems almost impossible to hit 200 points in a game. It's a great, great feeling. The crowd played a big part in us getting the record. Their hollering gave us the energy we needed."

For the game, 10 of the 11 Troy State players scored in double figures. Terry McCord, who the following season would be named an NCAA Division II All-American, led the team with 41 points on 16-for-26 shooting. The only player not to score in double figures was Andy Davis, who made the game's first basket and finished 1-for-1. Eight of the 11 Trojans scored at least 20 points, and of those, five scored at least 29. Smith recorded the game's only triple-double, with 29 points, 13 rebounds, and 11 assists. Of the many statistical anomalies to occur in this high-scoring game, one was that only three total free throws were attempted between the teams (Troy attempted, and made, all three). DeVry's Clayton Jones had 19 of the Hoyas' 44 turnovers by himself, while DeVry's Dartez Daniel scored a game-high 42 points on 20-for-30 shooting.

Box score

Aftermath
The January 12, 1992, game between Troy State and DeVry remains the highest-scoring single game in NCAA history. Seven statisticians worked for 57 minutes after the game ended to complete its box score. Among records considered unbreakable are total combined points (399), points by one team in one half (135), and three-pointers made (51) by one team in a single game. That season, Troy State compiled a 23–6 overall record while setting many school records along the way, including single-season scoring average (121.0), field goals made and attempted (1,274/2,839), three-pointers made and attempted (444/1,303), and steals (460). They also set single-game records for points (258), points in a half (135), field goals made and attempted (102/190), rebounds (94), assists (65), and total combined points for two teams in a single game. Troy State lost in the first round of the NCAA Division II Tournament. The Trojans have since transitioned to NCAA Division I, and the school changed its name to the current Troy University in 2005; while they have won six conference championships through the 2021–22 season, they have reached the NCAA Division I Tournament just twice. DeVry University, meanwhile, dropped its entire athletics program from its Atlanta campus in the 1990s. Its teams were rarely competitive, and the cost to maintain sports outweighed the returns. The basketball team finished the 1991–92 season with a 3–16 record.

2017 video analysis
On March 13, 2017, SB Nation'''s Jon Bois published a video in which he argued that the correct final score of the game should have been Troy State 253, DeVry 141. Relying on a single continuous recording of the game posted to YouTube, Bois counted all made baskets and arrived at 253 points for Troy State. He identified two potential scorer's errors: a Troy State dunk that went in after the horn had errantly blown that resulted in a return of the ball to Troy State, and an attempted three-point basket that ended with the ball lodged between the backboard and rim.

See also
 1916 Cumberland vs. Georgia Tech football game – the highest scoring college football game in history
 Grinnell System – a fast-tempo style of basketball developed by coach Dave Arseneault at Grinnell College in Grinnell, Iowa, similar to the tactics used by Don Maestri at Troy
 Nellie Ball – created by NBA head coach Don Nelson, it is a fast-paced run-and-gun offense relying on smaller, more athletic players who can create mismatches by outrunning their opponents

Footnotes
 The official box score lists Greasham's total points as 29. However, the number of two- and three-point field goals he tallied gives him 20 total points. Twenty points also correctly sums the team's total points to 258.
 In this game, Troy State had also set the record for most three-point attempts'' with 109. On December 8, 2022, that NCAA record was broken by Division III's Grinnell College when all 111 of their field goal attempts against Emmaus Bible College were three-pointers.

References

External links
 YouTube video of entire game

Troy State vs. DeVry
College basketball games in the United States
Troy Trojans men's basketball
DeVry University
January 1992 sports events in the United States
1992 in sports in Alabama